The Journal of Peasant Studies, subtitled Critical Perspectives on Rural Politics and Development, is a bimonthly peer-reviewed academic journal covering research into the social structures, institutions, actors, and processes of change in the rural areas of the developing world. It is published by Routledge and the editor-in-chief is Saturnino "Jun" Borras Jr. (International Institute of Social Studies).

Abstracting and indexing 
The journal is abstracted and indexed in Current Contents/Social & Behavioural Sciences, International Bibliography of the Social Sciences, International Political Science Abstracts, Scopus, the Social Sciences Citation Index, and Sociological Abstracts. According to the Journal Citation Reports, the journal has a 2013 impact factor of 5.477, ranking it first out of 81 journals in the category "Anthropology" and first out of 55 journals in the category "Planning and Development".

History 
The journal was an outgrowth of a 1972 University of London seminar on peasantries. It was established in 1973 with Terence J. Byres (1973–2000), Charles Curwen (1973–1984), and Teodor Shanin (1973–1975) as founding editors-in-chief. Other past editors of the journal have been Henry Bernstein (1985–2000) and Tom Brass (1990–1998, 2000–2008). The current editor is Saturnino Borras, Jr.

References

External links 
 

Publications established in 1973
Development studies journals
English-language journals
Taylor & Francis academic journals
Agricultural journals
Bimonthly journals